Villefranche-sur-Saône is a commune in the Rhône department in eastern France.

The inhabitants of the town are called Caladois.

History
Villefranche-sur-Saône was founded in 1212 by Guichard IV, count of Beaujeu, and became in the 14th century the capital of the Beaujolais province. It endured three sieges in the 15th and 16th centuries. The town walls were taken down early in the 19th century.

Population

The population data in the table and graph below refer to the commune of Villefranche-sur-Saône proper, in its geography at the given years. The commune of Villefranche-sur-Saône absorbed the former communes of Béligny and Ouilly (partly) in 1853.

Economy
Industries include wine-trading, metallurgy, textiles, and chemicals.

Transport
The Autoroute du Sud (the principal road from Paris to the south of France) is adjacent to the east of the town, running alongside the Saône.

Buildings
The church of Notre-Dame des Marais, begun at the end of the 14th and finished in the 16th century, has a tower and spire (rebuilt in 1862), standing to the right of the 15th century façade, in which are carved wooden doors.

Sport
FC Villefranche Beaujolais is based in the town.

Notable people
Pierre Teilhard de Chardin (1881–1955), Jesuit priest and scientist, attended school here in 1892–1897
Maurice Baquet (1911–2005), actor and cellist
Benjamin Biolay (born 1973), singer, songwriter and musician
Coralie Clément (born 1978), singer
Grégory Bettiol (born 1986), footballer

Twin towns – sister cities

Villefranche-sur-Saône is twinned with:
 Bertinoro, Italy
 Bühl, Germany
 Călărași District, Moldova
 Kandi, Benin
 Schkeuditz, Germany

See also
Communes of the Rhône department

References

External links
Official website 

 
Communes of Rhône (department)
Subprefectures in France
Beaujolais (province)